Stacy, sometimes spelled Stacey, Staci, Stacie, or Stacii, is a common first name for women, and occasionally men. 

Baby-naming guides cite two English derivations of Greek origins: Anastasia, meaning "resurrection", for girls, and Eustace (Eustathios), meaning "steadfast", for boys.

Stacy, Stacey, Stacie or Staci may also refer to:

Notable male people with the name

Stacey 
 Stacey Arceneaux (1936-2015), American NBA player
 Stacey Augmon (born 1968), American NBA player
 Stacey B. Day (born 1927), British educator and physician
 Stacey Bailey (born 1960), American former NFL player
 Stacey Blades (born 1968), Canadian heavy metal guitarist
 Stacey Campfield (born 1968), American politician
 Stacey David, American television personality and host
 Stacey Dillard (born 1968), American former NFL player
 Stacey Hairston (born 1967), American gridiron football coach and former player
 Stacey Hassard, Canadian politician
 Stacey Hawkins, American air force lieutenant general
 Stacey Ili (born 1991), Samoan rugby union player
 Stacey Katu (born 1983), Cook Island former NRL player
 Stacey King (born 1967), American sports announcer and retired NBA player
 Stacey Koon (born 1950), American convicted criminal and former police sergeant
 Stacey Madden (born 1982), Canadian writer
 Stacey Mack (born 1975), American former NFL player
 Stacey Muruthi (born 1952), Singaporean cricketer of Indian descent
 Stacey North (born 1964), English former professional footballer
 Stacey Pickering (born 1968), American politician and public official
 Stacey Pullen, American techno musician
 Stacey Ross (born 1973), English former professional squash player
 Stacey Simmons (American football) (born 1968), American former NFL player
 Stacey Spiegel (born 1955), Canadian artist and new media designer
 Stacey Thomas (American football) (born 1984), American NFL player
 Stacey Toran (1961-1989), American NFL player

Stacy 
 Stacy Adams (American football) (born 1966), American former football coach
 Stacy Andrews (born 1981), American former NFL player
 Stacy Aumonier (1877-1928), British short story writer, novelist, and stage performer
 Stacy Barcroft Lloyd Jr. (1908-1994), American businessman, horse breeder, dairy cattle farmer, and yachtsman
 Stacy Bragger (born 1984), Falkland Island journalist and politician
 Stacy Burk, American country singer-songwriter, photographer, producer, and creative artist
 Stacy Christakakis (born 1964), Australian football coach
 Stacy Coldicott (born 1974), English former professional footballer
 Stacy Coley (born 1994), American NFL player
 Stacy Collins (born 1975), American football coach and former player
 Stacy Compton (born 1967), American NASCAR driver
 Stacy Curtis (born 1971), American cartoonist, illustrator, and printmaker
 Stacy D. VanDeveer (born 1967), American academic and international relations scholar
 Stacy Dean Campbell (born 1967), American singer-songwriter, author, and TV host
 Stacy F. Sauls (born 1955), American former Episcopal bishop
 Stacy Gore (born 1963), American NFL player
 Stacy Harris (1918-1973), American actor
 Stacy Johnson, several people
 Stacy Jones (disambiguation), several people
 Stacy Keach (born 1941), American actor and narrator
 Stacy Keach, Sr. (1914-2003), American actor and father of Stacy Keach
 Stacy Kohut (born 1970), Canadian Paralympic skier
 Stacy Long (born 1985), English former professional footballer
 Stacy Long (American football) (born 1967), American former NFL player
 Stacy Mader, Australian astronomer
 Stacy McGaugh (born 1964), American astronomer and professor
 Stacy McGee (born 1990), American NFL player
 Stacy Mitchhart (born 1959), American blues guitarist
 Stacy Parrish (born 1968), American songwriter, musician, engineer, and record producer
 Stacy Peralta (born 1957), American film director, entrepreneur, and former professional skateboarder- and team surfer
 Stacy Phillips (1944-2018), American resophonic guitarist and fiddler
 Stacy Robinson (1962-2012), American NFL player
 Stacy Roest (born 1974), Canadian former NHL player
 Stacy Searels (born 1965), American current college football coach
 Stacy Seegars (born c. 1972), American former football player
 Stacy Smith (disambiguation), several people
 Stacy Spikes (born 1968), American entrepreneur and former film marketing executive and producer
 Stacy Tutt (born 1982), American former NFL player
 Stacy Woodard (1902-1942), American producer, cinematographer, and editor of nature films

Notable female people with the name

Stacey 
 Stacey Abrams (born 1973), American politician, lawyer, voting rights activist, author, and director of Fair Fight Action
 Stacey Allaster (born 1963), Canadian-born American sports executive and administrator
 Stacey-Ann Williams (born 1999), Jamaican athlete
 Stacey Ball (born 1973), Canadian former pair skater
 Stacey Barr (born 1992), Australian AFLW player and WNBL player
 Stacey Bendet (born 1978), American fashion designer
 Stacey Bent, American chemical engineering professor
 Stacey Bentley (1957-2019), American registered nurse and professional bodybuilder
 Stacey Bess (born 1963), American author and educator
 Stacey Blumer (born 1969), American freestyle skier
 Stacey Bowen (born 1969), Canadian retired sprinter
 Stacey Bradford, American financial journalist, author, and commentator
 Stacey Bridges (born 1988), American rugby union player and assistant coach
 Stacey Cadman (born 1979), British actress and television presenter
 Stacey Carr (born 1984), New Zealand field hockey player
 Stacey Castor (1967-2016), American poisoner convicted of murdering her husband and suspected of having murdered her previous husband
 Stacey Chepkemboi Ndiwa (born 1992), Kenyan long-distance runner
 Stacey Cole (born 1982), English beach volleyball player
 Stacey Cook (born 1984), American alpine ski racer
 Stacey Copeland (born 1981), English professional boxer, teacher, and former footballer
 Stacey Cunningham (born 1974/1975), American banker who served as the 67th president of the NYSE
 Stacey Dales (born 1979), Canadian former WNBA player and current sportscaster
 Stacey Dash (born 1966), American actress
 Stacey Day (born 1988), English association footballer
 Stacey D'Erasmo (born 1961), American author and literary critic
 Stacey Devina Chan (born 1998), Hong Kong rhythmic gymnast
 Stacey Dixon (born 1971), American mechanical engineer and intelligence official
 Stacey Donato, American politician
 Stacey Dooley (born 1987), English television presenter, journalist, and media personality
 Stacey Doubell (born 1987), South African retired badminton player
 Stacey Earle (born 1960), American singer-songwriter
 Stacey Enos (born 1964), American former footballer
 Stacey Evans (born 1978), American politician
 Stacey Farber (born 1987), Canadian actress
 Stacey Ferreira (born 1992), American entrepreneur, speaker, and author
 Stacey Finley, American science professor
 Stacey Flood (born 1996), Irish rugby player
 Stacey Fluhler (born 1995), New Zealand rugby union player
 Stacey Fox (born 1965), American transdisciplinary artist, animator, master percussionist, composer, and filmmaker
 Stacey Francis-Bayman (born 1988), English former netball player
 Stacey Franks (born 1989), English pop singer
 Stacey Fru (born 2007), South African writer and activist
 Stacey Gabriel, American geneticist and biologist
 Stacey Gartrell (born 1977), Australian former freestyle long-distance swimmer
 Stacey Glick (born 1971/1972), American former child actress and current literary agent
 Stacey Gordon, American puppeteer and actress
 Stacey Grenrock-Woods (born 1968), American writer, actress, and former correspondent on The Daily Show
 Stacey Grimaldi (1790-1863), English lawyer and antiquary
 Stacey Guerin, American politician
 Stacey Hayes (born 1976), English television infomercial spokesperson, comedian, actress, model, and one-time competitive ice-skater
 Stacey Hillyard (born 1969), English former professional snooker player
 Stacey Hobgood-Wilkes (born 1968), American politician
 Stacey Hollywood (born 1968), American actress, model, and LGBT nightclub personality
 Stacey Hymer (born 1999), Australian taekwondo athlete
 Stacey Kade, American author
 Stacey Keating (born 1986), Australian golfer
 Stacey Kemp (born 1988), English former competitive pair skater
 Stacey Kent (born 1965), American jazz singer
 Stacey Knecht (born 1957), American translator
 Stacey Lannert (born 1972), American convicted murderer
 Stacey Lee, American author of young adult fiction
 Stacey Lee (film director), New Zealand documentary film director
 Stacey Lee Webber (born 1982), American metalsmith
 Stacey Leilua (born 1982), New Zealand actress and producer of Samoan descent
 Stacey Levine, American novelist, short story author, and journalist
 Stacey Liapis (born 1974), American curler
 Stacey Livingstone (born 1988), Australian rules footballer
 Stacey Lovelace-Tolbert (born 1974), American WNBA player
 Stacey Lynch (born 1980), Australian virologist
 Stacey M. Floyd-Thomas (born 1969), American author and educator
 Stacey Marinkovich (born 1981), Australian former netball player and current coach
 Stacey Martin (born 1970), American former professional tennis player
 Stacey May Fowles (born 1979), Canadian writer
 Stacey McDougall (born 1990), Scottish international lawn and indoor bowler
 Stacey McGunnigle (born 1985-1987), Canadian actress and comedian
 Stacey McKenzie (born 1977), Jamaican-born Canadian model, runway coach motivational speaker, and television personality
 Stacey McManus (born 1989), Australian softball player
 Stacey Michelsen (born 1991), New Zealand field hockey player
 Stacey Milbern (1987-2020), Korean-American disability rights activist
 Stacey Missmer, American reproductive biologist and professor
 Stacey Mitchell (1990-2006), British girl murdered in Australia by lesbian couple Jessica Stasinowsky and Valerie Parashumti
 Stacey Morris, American barber and hairdresser
 Stacey Morrison (born 1973/1974), New Zealand television- and radio host, actress, and MC
 Stacey Naris (born 1991), Namibian international footballer
 Stacey Nelkin (born 1959), American film and television actress
 Stacey Nelson (born 1987), American former softball pitcher
 Stacey Nesbitt (born 1997), professional motorcycle road racer
 Stacey Nicole English (1975-2012), American formerly missing person
 Stacey Nuveman-Deniz (born 1978), American former professional softball player and current head coach
 Stacey Oristano (born 1979), American actress
 Stacey Patton, American journalist, writer, author, speaker, commentator, and college professor
 Stacey Pensgen (born 1982), American former competitive figure skater and current meteorologist
 Stacey Pheffer Amato (born 1966), American politician
 Stacey Plaskett (born 1966), American politician, attorney, and commentator
 Stacey Poon-Kinney (born 1978/1979), American chef and restaurateur
 Stacey Porter (born 1982), Australian professional indigenous softball player
 Stacey Q (born 1958), American singer, songwriter, dancer, and actress
 Stacey Redmond (born 1988), Irish camogie player
 Stacey Reile (born 1973), American boxer
 Stacey Richter (born 1965), American writer of short fiction
 Stacey Roca (born 1978), English actress
 Stacey Roy, Canadian actress, producer, host, and streamer
 Stacey Ryan, Canadian singer and songwriter
 Stacey Schefflin (born 1968), American former professional tennis player
 Stacey Schroeder (born 1979), American film editor
 Stacey Sher (born 1962), American film producer
 Stacey Shortall, New Zealand lawyer
 Stacey Simmons (born 1972), Bermudian former cricketer
 Stacey Sinclair (born 1971), American psychologist and professor
 Stacey Smith (disambiguation), several people
 Stacey Snider (born 1961), American film industry executive
 Stacey Solomon (born 1989), English singer and television personality who won third place on the sixth series of the UK version of The X Factor
 Stacey Tappan (born 1973), American coloratura soprano
 Stacey Tendeter (1949-2008), English actress
 Stacey Thomas (born 1978), American former WNBA player
 Stacey Thomson (born 1964), Australian television presenter
 Stacey Tookey (born 1976), Canadian choreographer and dancer
 Stacey Travers, American politician, scientist, and army veteran
 Stacey Travis (born 1964), American actress
 Stacey Tyrell, Canadian photographer
 Stacey Waite, American poet
 Stacey West, several people
 Stacey Williams (born 1968), American fashion model
 Stacey Williams (swimmer) (born 1981), Australian Paralympic swimming competitor
 Stacey Wooley (born 1968), American biathlete

Staci 
 Staci Appel (born 1966), American politician
 Staci Bilbo, American neuroimmunologist and professor
 Staci Flood (born 1974), American singer, dancer, and model
 Staci Frenes (born 1963), American Christian musician
 Staci Greason, American actress
 Staci Gruber, American psychiatry professor and cannabis researcher
 Staci Keanan (born 1975), American attorney, law professor, and former actress
 Staci-Lyn Honda, American former reporter
 Staci M. Yandle (born 1961), American district judge
 Staci Mannella (born 1996), American Paralympic alpine skier
 Staci Simonich, American environmental scientist, professor, and dean
 Staci Wilson (born 1976), American soccer player and Olympic champion

Stacie 
 Stacie Anaka (born 1987), Canadian freestyle wrestler
 Stacie Cassarino (born 1975), American poet, educator, editor, and author
 Stacie Chan (born 1984), American actress and journalist of Chinese descent
 Stacie Curtis (born 1986), Canadian curler
 Stacie E. Goddard, American political scientist
 Stacie Foster, American actress
 Stacie Huckeba (born 1968), American photographer, film director, writer, and public speaker
 Stacie L. Hixon, American attorney, jurist, and judge
 Stacie Laughton (born c. 1984), American politician
 Stacie Louttit (born 1961), Canadian Paralympic sailor
 Stacie Lynn Renna (born 1973), American film-, television-, and stage actress
 Stacie Mistysyn (born 1971), American-born Canadian former actress
 Stacie Orrico (born 1986), American singer, songwriter, and occasional actress
 Stacie Passon (born 1969), American film director, screenwriter, and producer
 Stacie Powell (born 1985), British diver and astronomer
 Stacie Randall (born 1962), American actress
 Stacie Terry-Hutson (born 1976), American basketball coach and former player

Stacy 
 Stacy A. Littlejohn, American screenwriter, producer, and showrunner
 Stacy Allison (born 1958), American summiter of Mount Everest
 Stacy Amoateng, Ghanaian television presenter/producer, media consultant, philanthropist, and actress
 Stacy Anam (born 1990), Malaysian singer, composer, and songwriter who won the sixth season of Akademi Fantasia
 Stacy-Ann Gooden, Jamaican-born American model and weather reporter
 Stacy Apfelbaum, American retired rowing cox
 Stacy Arthur (1968-2019), American model and actress
 Stacy Babb (born 1983), Bermudian cricketer
 Stacy Barnett, victim in the murders of John Goosey and Stacy Barnett
 Stacy Barthe (born 1985), American songwriter, composer, and singer
 Stacy Bennett, American politician
 Stacy Bishop (born 1985), American former NWSL player
 Stacy Blake-Beard, American psychologist
 Stacy Boyle (born 1974), American former rugby union player
 Stacy Bregman (born 1986), South African professional golfer
 Stacy Brenner, American politician, registered nurse, small business owner, and organic farmer
 Stacy Bromberg (1956-2017), American darts player
 Stacy Brooks (born 1952), American activist; one of the most public and outspoken critics of the Church of Scientology
 Stacy Brown-Philpot, American computer businesswoman
 Stacy C. Hollander, American art scholar and former American museum curator
 Stacy Carter (born 1970), American retired professional wrestler and valet
 Stacy Clark (born 1980), American singer and songwriter
 Stacy Clinesmith (born 1978), American former WNBA player and current college assistant coach
 Stacy Cochran, American film director, screenwriter, and producer
 Stacy Dean, American policy advisor
 Stacy-Deanne (born 1978), American author
 Stacy Dittrich (born 1973), American author, mystery novelist, and former police detective
 Stacy Doris (1962-2012), American poet
 Stacy Dorning (born 1958), English actress
 Stacy Dragila (born 1971), American pole vaulter
 Stacy DuPree (born 1988), band member of Eisley
 Stacy Earl (born 1963), American dancer, pop singer, and actress
 Stacy Edwards (born 1965), American actress
 Stacy Erwin Oakes (born 1973), American politician
 Stacy Ferguson (born 1975), American pop singer (part of Wild Orchid and The Black Eyed Peas)
 Stacy Francis (born 1969), American singer and actress
 Stacy Fuson (born 1978), American model
 Stacy Galina (born 1966), American jeweler and former actress
 Stacy Garrity (born 1964), American politician, businesswoman, and soldier
 Stacy Gaskill (born 2000), American snowboarder
 Stacy H. Schusterman (born c. 1963), American billionaire businesswoman and philanthropist
 Stacy Haiduk (born 1968), American actress
 Stacy Hansmeyer (born 1978), American former NCAA basketball player and former coach
 Stacy Hardy, South African writer, journalist, multimedia artist, and theater practitioner
 Stacy Head (born 1969), American lawyer and former politician
 Stacy Horn (born 1956), American author, businesswoman, and occasional journalist
 Stacy Igel, American fashion designer, author, founder, and creative director
 Stacy Jefferson (born 1946), British actress
 Stacy Jo Scott (born 1981), American artist, art educator, curator, and writer
 Stacy Jupiter (born 1975), Fijian marine scientist
 Stacy Kamano (born 1974), American television actress
 Stacy Keibler (born 1979), American model, actress, retired professional wrestler, and former WWE Diva
 Stacy King, American former film- and television actress
 Stacy Lackay (born 1994), South African cricketer
 Stacy Lande, American contemporary lowbrow painter
 Stacy Lattisaw (born 1966), American R&B singer
 Stacy Leeds (born 1971), American law professor, scholar, and former politician
 Stacy Lentz (born 1970), American LGBT rights activist
 Stacy Levy (born 1960), American sculptor
 Stacy Lewis (born 1985), American professional golfer
 Stacy London (born 1969), American fashion consultant and media personality
 Stacy Longstreet, American art director and role-playing game artist
 Stacy Lyn Harris, American cookbook author, blogger, television host, gardener, and public speaker
 Stacy Lynn Waddell (born 1966), American artist
 Stacy Makishi, Hawaiian-born performance artist, and physical theater and live art specialist
 Stacy Margolin (born 1959), American tennis player
 Stacy-Marie Ishmael, Trinidad and Tobago journalist and editor
 Stacy Martin (born 1990), French actress
 Stacy Morze, American theater actress and musician
 Stacy Offner, American rabbi
 Stacy Osei-Kuffour (born 1987), American playwright, actress, and writer
 Stacy Otieno (born 1990), Kenyan rugby sevens player
 Stacy Pearsall (born 1980), American photographer
 Stacy Philpott, American ecologist and professor
 Stacy Piagno (born 1991), American baseball player
 Stacy Prammanasudh (born 1979), American retired professional golfer
 Stacy Ritter (born 1960), American politician
 Stacy Roiall (born 1977), New Zealand-born Australian sport shooter
 Stacy Rowles (1955-2009), American jazz trumpeter, flugelhornist, and vocalist
 Stacy Rukeyser (born 1970), American television writer and producer
 Stacy Schiff (born 1961), American author
 Stacy Sykora (born 1977), American retired volleyball player
 Stacy Szymaszek (born 1969), American poet, professor, and arts administrator
 Stacy Tessler Lindau, American gynecologist and practicing OB-GYN
 Stacy Title (1964-2021), American film director and producer
 Stacy Valentine (born 1970), American former pornographic actress
 Stacy Westfall (born 1974), American professional horse trainer
 Stacy Wilson (born 1965), Canadian former women's hockey team captain, former assistant coach, author, and former women’s ice hockey team head coach
 Stacy (zouk singer), Martiniquai and Guyanese zouk singer

Fictional characters 
 Captain George Stacy, a character in the Spider-Man comic books and films, father of Peter Parker's first love, Gwen. 
 Gwen Stacy, a character in the Spider-Man comics, and the Amazing Spider-Man films
 Stacy Aligf, a character in the soap opera Aligf Unleashed & a character in the "Aligf Unleashed Movie Series"
 Stacy Hanseni, character from the Girl Talk series of books
 Malibu Stacy, a doll appearing in The Simpsons episode, "Lisa vs. Malibu Stacy"
 Stacey Colbert, a character in Ned & Stacey
 Stacy, a character from Axeman played by Elissa Dowling
 Stacy Hirano, a character in the Disney Channel animated series Phineas and Ferb
 Stacey, a character from the film Gore, Quebec
 Stacie Monroe, a character in the television series  Hustle
 Stacey, a character in Candyman
 Stacey Petrie, a recurring character in the television series The Dick Van Dyke Show
 Stacie Roberts, a doll who is a sister to Barbie
 Stacy Rowe, character in the MTV animated series Daria
 Stacy, a character from the film The Sleeper
 Stacey Slater, a character in the British soap opera EastEnders
 Stacy Stickler, a main character in the Canadian animated series Stickin' Around
 Stacey Sutton, a character in the James Bond film A View to a Kill
 Stacey Shipman (née West), titular character in the BBC sitcom Gavin & Stacey
 Stacy Townsend, character in the Radio Times comic strips
 Stacy Warner, a character in the television drama House
 Stacey Hanson, the titular character of the film Stacey
 Stacy Jones, a fictional stationmaster by Didi Conn in the PBS television series Shining Time Station
 Stacy X, a character in the Marvel Comics universe
 Stacey, a character in the film The Visit
 Staci, a fictional character in the reality show parody Total Drama: Revenge of the Island
 Stacy Hamilton, a character from the 1980s film Fast Times at Ridgemont High
 Stacee Jaxx, a fictional character from the film Rock of Ages
 Stacy Twelfmann, a character from the film Cherry Falls
 Stacie Conrad, a character in the 2012 film Pitch Perfect
 Stacy, a character in the film The Ruins and the novel it was based on
 Anastasia "Stacey" Elizabeth McGill, main character from The Baby-Sitters Club book series
 Stacey Bridges, a character in High Plains Drifter
Stacey Cameron MacAindra, main character in Margaret Laurence's The Fire Dwellers

In popular culture
The name Stacy is used to refer to the female counterpart of Chad.

References

English feminine given names
English given names
Unisex given names
English unisex given names
Given names of Greek language origin